Afro Blue is an a cappella jazz ensemble at Howard University, directed by Connaitre Miller.  They have released 4 albums.

Sing-Off
The version of Afro Blue that performed on The Sing-Off Season 3 went on to create the group Traces of Blue.

References

Howard University
Musical groups from Washington, D.C.